John Casimir (October 16, 1898 – January 3, 1963) was an American jazz clarinetist and bandleader, best remembered as the leader of The Young Tuxedo Brass Band for some 20 years up to his death.

Career 
Casimir started playing professionally with the Young Eagles Band with Lee Collins in 1919. He was also a member of the Original Tuxedo Brass Band, often following the lead of Louis Armstrong.

The Young Tuxedo Brass Band's 1958 album was released under the title Jazz Begins by Atlantic Records. It was the only recording the band released under his leadership. Casimir also led a dance band using some of the same musicians under the name the Young Tuxedo Jazz Band, which also recorded. Casimir played Bb clarinet with the jazz band, and the distinctive higher Eb clarinet with brass bands.

Source
 New Orleans Jazz: A Family Album by Al Rose and Edmond Souchon, Third Edition, Louisiana State University Press, 1984

References

1898 births
1963 deaths
Jazz musicians from New Orleans
American jazz clarinetists
20th-century American musicians
Tuxedo Brass Band members
Young Tuxedo Brass Band members
Eureka Brass Band members